Toulouse Métropole is one of the 20  French metropolises, an intercommunal structure, centred on the city of Toulouse. It is located in the Haute-Garonne department, in the Occitanie region, southern France. It was created in January 2015, replacing the previous . Its area is 458.2 km2. Its population was 783,353 in 2018, of which 486,828 in Toulouse proper. It is the 5th largest metropolis after Greater Paris, Lille-Europe and Bordeaux. Its annual budget is €1,4 billion (2015).

History 
It was created on 1 January 2015, succeeding the urban community of Toulouse, which had itself succeeded in 2009 and 2001 to previous districts created in 1992 with less powers than either the urban community or the current metropolitan region.

Geography 
Due to local political feuds, Toulouse Métropole only hosts 59% of the population of the metropolitan area (see infobox at Toulouse article for the metropolitan area), the other independent communes of the metropolitan area having refused to join in, notably Muret and the technopolis of Labège-Innopole.

Consequently, the other parts of the metropolitan area have formed different intercommunal structures, such as:
 Communauté d'agglomération Le Muretain Agglo
 Communauté d'agglomération du Sicoval, with Labège-Innopole in it
 Communauté de communes de la Save au Touch
 etc.

Member communes
The 37 communes of Toulouse Métropole are:

Aigrefeuille
Aucamville
Aussonne
Balma
Beaupuy
Beauzelle
Blagnac
Brax
Bruguières
Castelginest
Colomiers
Cornebarrieu
Cugnaux
Drémil-Lafage
Fenouillet
Flourens
Fonbeauzard
Gagnac-sur-Garonne
Gratentour
Launaguet
Lespinasse
Mondonville
Mondouzil
Mons
Montrabé
Pibrac
Pin-Balma
Quint-Fonsegrives
Saint-Alban
Saint-Jean
Saint-Jory
Saint-Orens-de-Gameville
Seilh
Toulouse
Tournefeuille
L'Union
Villeneuve-Tolosane

References

External links
 Metropolitan Toulouse website

Toulouse
Metropolis in France
Toulouse